Pavlomatveyevskaya is a rural locality (a village) in Tarnogskoye Rural Settlement, Tarnogsky District, Vologda Oblast, Russia. The population was 12 as of 2002.

Geography 
Pavlomatveyevskaya is located 30 km northeast of Tarnogsky Gorodok (the district's administrative centre) by road. Alexandrovskaya is the nearest rural locality.

References 

Rural localities in Tarnogsky District